Dorothea Douglass defeated Ethel Thomson 4–6, 6–4, 6–2 in the all comers' final to win the ladies' singles tennis title at the 1903 Wimbledon Championships. The reigning champion Muriel Robb did not defend her title.

Draw

All comers' finals

Top half

Bottom half

References

External links

Ladies' Singles
Wimbledon Championship by year – Women's singles
Wimbledon Championships - Singles
Wimbledon Championships - Singles